Joseph Hatch ( 1837 – 2 September 1928) was a New Zealand politician who is best remembered for the harvesting of penguins and elephant seals for their oil on the sub-Antarctic Macquarie Island from 1890 to 1919. Around two million penguins were killed over nearly three decades. His company, J. Hatch & Co., was based in Invercargill, New Zealand, and then Hobart, Tasmania, where he is buried.

Early life
Hatch was born in London, England, in 1837 or 1838, and was a qualified chemist (pharmacist). In 1862 en route from Melbourne to Invercargill he saw the island with multitudes of penguins and sea elephants. He settled in Invercargill where he opened a pharmacy.

Political career

In Invercargill, he became a Councillor in 1876. He was Mayor of Invercargill in 1877–1878. His oil factor trade was controversial even then, although he was an entertaining speaker and debater. He stood in the Invercargill electorate once more in the  but was defeated by the incumbent, James Whyte Kelly.

Oil trade
The Dunedin firm of Elder and Co had pioneered the sea elephant oiling industry on Macquarie Island from 1878 to 1884. Hatch's gang started with sea elephant bulls in 1887, but in 1889 with fewer bulls and the Norwegian development of a steam-pressure digestor which could extract oil from meat and bone as well as blubber and from smaller animals like penguins, Hatch realised the financial potential from harvesting the penguins on Macquarie Island. Of the four species of penguin on the island (rockhopper, king, royal and gentoo) the royal penguin was mainly used. Eventually, oiling plants were established at Lusitania Bay, South East Bay, The Nuggets, Hasselborough Bay and Bauer Bay.

Hatch had a legal dispute with his captain, Jacob Eckhoff, over his ship, and there were three shipwrecks around the island (Gratitude, 1898; Clyde and Jessie Nichol 1910) with 20 deaths. The New Zealand Government was restricting the seal killing season from 1875, although Macquarie Island was unclaimed. By 1919 objections culminated in perhaps the first-ever international campaign to preserve wildlife, with Antarctic explorers like Douglas Mawson, Frank Hurley and Apsley Cherry-Garrard, supported by H. G. Wells in his story The Undying Fire and Baron Walter Rothschild.

Hatch had supporters in New Zealand as well, including his fellow Southland politician Sir Joseph Ward and the Tasmanian state government in Australia. He got a seven-year oiling lease from the Tasmanian state government in 1905, and in 1912 the headquarters was moved to Hobart, Tasmania. In 1915, a new company, Southern Isles Exploitation Co., was established but by 1919 the Tasmanian government would extend the lease only for a year. In 1922 Hatch was a Nationalist candidate for the state seat of Denison, but he was not elected. By 1926, the company had collapsed, and Hatch lost his properties in Invercargill and Hobart.

Family and death
He married Sarah Annie Wilson in Melbourne, Australia, in 1869. They had three daughters and four sons. Hatch died in 1928, aged 91.

References

Further reading

External links
Dictionary of New Zealand Biography
Harvest of Souls from New Zealand Geographic
Joseph Hatch and the Oiling Industry (Pdf document)
Labels for Elephant Seal Harness Oil (Pdf document)

1837 births
1928 deaths
Macquarie Island
Members of the New Zealand House of Representatives
New Zealand businesspeople
Invercargill City Councillors
Mayors of Invercargill
Businesspeople from London
New Zealand MPs for South Island electorates
Unsuccessful candidates in the 1887 New Zealand general election
Unsuccessful candidates in the 1893 New Zealand general election
19th-century New Zealand politicians
Sealers
New Zealand hunters